The 1977 National Camogie League was the first to be played in the sport of camogie. It was won by Tipperary who defeated Wexford in a replayed final and became first holders of the AIB Cup, which was presented to Monica Butler by Eddie Keher. Helena O'Neill refereed.

Structure
Matches commenced in September 1976. Antrim, Dublin, Kilkenny, and Wexford competed in the eastern zone, which was won with Wexford after play-off victories over Dublin and Kilkenny. Tipperary beat Galway 2-3 to 1-4 to win the Western Zone.

Final
The first National League final was staged on a fresh day in Rathnure. Each team scored a goal and a point in the first half, Kit Codd and Eileen O’Gorman for Wexford and Deirdre Lane for Tipperary. Monica Butler at full back for Tipperary, according to The Nenagh Guardian:
“gave an incredible display tirelessly repulsing attack after attack from the sharp-striking Wexford forwards and even when suffering from a painful shoulder injury insisted on staying on to lead her team to fight another day.
Eileen Kehoe scored a goal for Wexford early in the second half and ten minutes from the end Maol Muire Tynan gathered the ball at midfield and set off n a solo run that ended with a memorable goal from an acute angle.

Replay
The replay took place at Semple stadium, with the Upperchurch-Drombane youth band leading the pre match parade.
Maol Muire Tynan scored a goal after just 20 seconds, setting the pattern for the game as a confident Tipperary side, despite playing into the breeze kept their rivals under pressure. They had a second goal from Maura Hogan but Wexford kept their hopes alive when Kit Codd scored a goal just before half time.
Maol Muire Tynan scored another quick Tipperary goal at the start of the second half and the issue was put beyond doubt shortly afterwards when Deirdre Lane scored Tipperary's fourth goal. The Nenagh Guardian reported:
On the day Tipperary were the better side, using the bal intelligently and generally showing greater earnestness in their endeavours.

Aftermath
Maol Muire Tynan later became a successful journalist with the Sunday Press and Sunday Business Post. Liz Howard later went on to become president of the Camogie Association.

Final stages

Draw March 6 Tipperary 2-1 Wexford 2-1

Replay March 20 Tipperary 4-2 Wexford 1-3

MATCH RULES
60 minutes
Replay if scores level
Maximum of 5 substitutions

References

1977
National Camogie League, 1977
1976 in camogie